Cristian Alberto 'Kily' González Peret (born 4 August 1974) is an Argentine football manager and former professional footballer who played mainly as a left winger, and is currently a head coach.

He started his career with Rosario Central which he would represent in three different spells, moving to Spain in 1996 where he appeared for Zaragoza and Valencia, amassing La Liga totals of 182 matches and 23 goals during seven seasons and winning the national championship with the latter. He also spent three years in Italy with Inter Milan.

González's spell in the Argentina national team lasted for ten years, in which he was selected for the 2002 World Cup and two Copa América tournaments, for a total of 56 caps.

Club career

Early years
Born in Rosario, Santa Fe, González started playing with local Rosario Central, making his Argentine Primera División debut on 18 December 1993 in a 0–2 away loss against Club de Gimnasia y Esgrima La Plata.

After two years he moved to Boca Juniors, spending the 1995–96 season there and playing alongside Diego Maradona.

Spain
In 1996, González was transferred to Real Zaragoza. He appeared in his first game in La Liga on 8 September by playing 19 minutes in a 2–1 win at Sevilla FC and, during his three-year spell in Aragon, shared teams with countryman Gustavo López who was also a winger.

Subsequently, González joined fellow league club Valencia CF for 1,300,000 pesetas, being teammate to also Argentines Pablo Aimar and Roberto Ayala for several seasons and contributing with 31 matches and two goals in the 2001–02 campaign as his team won the league title after a 31-year wait. Following the emergence of younger Vicente he became surplus to requirements – only 13 appearances and 546 minutes of action in his last year, which also included a run-in with manager Rafael Benítez– and left the Che as a free agent; additionally, he amassed UEFA Champions League combined totals of 31 matches and five goals as they reached the final in 2000 and 2001, and was granted Spanish nationality in early January 2001.

Inter
In summer 2003, González followed Valencia coach Héctor Cuper to Inter Milan, and again shared teams with several compatriots.

He was used mainly as a substitute during his tenure, playing 75 official games and failing to find the net.

Return home
Aged 32, González returned to his country and Rosario Central, going on to still be an important first-team member during three top flight seasons. On 4 August 2009, he joined San Lorenzo de Almagro who was managed by former national teammate Diego Simeone; after the former's relegation, however, he decided to rejoin for a third spell and help in the Primera B Nacional campaign, following which he retired at 37.

In June 2020, after over a year in charge of its reserve team, González became Rosario Central's manager on an 18-month contract. On his debut on 3 November, the club won 2–1 at home to Godoy Cruz Antonio Tomba.

González led Central to the quarter-finals of the Copa Sudamericana in 2021, losing 5–3 on aggregate to Brazil's Red Bull Bragantino in August. The following 20 March, after a derby defeat to Newell's Old Boys, he was dismissed.

International career
An Argentine international since 1995, González made his debut on 8 November in a 0–1 home defeat to Brazil. He was selected by manager Marcelo Bielsa for his 1999 Copa América squad, scoring one of his nine goals in the nation's 2–0 group stage win against Uruguay as the former went on to reach the quarter finals only to be eliminated by eventual champions Brazil. He went on to become a regular member of the starting eleven under that coach, and also participated in the 2002 FIFA World Cup in Japan and South Korea, starting against England (and being replaced) and also appearing against Nigeria and Sweden in an eventual group stage exit.

Two years later, again under Bielsa, González was selected for the 2004 Summer Olympics tournament as one of three overaged players. He featured in all games and scored in the opener against Serbia (6–0), helping the Albiceleste win gold in Athens.

González also took part in the 2004 Copa América, netting three times in the tournament: his first two came in the group stage, in Argentina's victories against Ecuador and Uruguay, and his last was a penalty in regulation time in the final against Brazil, which eventually ended in a shootout loss with the player again converting his attempt.

Style of play
González was a quick, strong and versatile midfielder, who was capable of playing both as a winger and as an attacking midfielder. His main attributes were his technical ability, vision, range of passing, determination and his powerful and accurate striking ability from distance, which enabled him both to create and score goals.

Career statistics

Club

International

Scores and results list Argentina's goal tally first, score column indicates score after each González goal.

Managerial statistics 
As of 20 March 2022

Honours

Valencia
La Liga: 2001–02
Supercopa de España: 1999
UEFA Champions League: Runner-up 1999–2000, 2000–01

Inter Milan
Serie A: 2005–06
Coppa Italia: 2004–05, 2005–06
Argentina Olympic team
Summer Olympics: 2004
Argentina

 Copa América: 2004 (Runner-up)

Individual
UEFA Team of the Year: 2001

References

External links

  
 
 
 
 Inter archives 
 

1974 births
Living people
Footballers from Rosario, Santa Fe
Argentine people of Spanish descent
Argentine footballers
Association football wingers
Argentine Primera División players
Primera Nacional players
Rosario Central footballers
Boca Juniors footballers
San Lorenzo de Almagro footballers
La Liga players
Real Zaragoza players
Valencia CF players
Serie A players
Inter Milan players
Argentina international footballers
2002 FIFA World Cup players
1999 Copa América players
2004 Copa América players
Olympic footballers of Argentina
Footballers at the 2004 Summer Olympics
Olympic medalists in football
Olympic gold medalists for Argentina
Medalists at the 2004 Summer Olympics
Argentine expatriate footballers
Expatriate footballers in Spain
Expatriate footballers in Italy
Argentine expatriate sportspeople in Spain
Argentine expatriate sportspeople in Italy